Alun Leach-Jones  (1937 – 24 December 2017), was a British-born Australian artist known for his range of work covering painting, drawing, sculpture, linocuts, screenprints and etchings.

Early life
Born in Maghull, Lancashire, in the UK, his family moved to the village of Glasfryn in North Wales where he spent his childhood. In 1951, age 14, he began a three-year apprenticeship with the Solicitors Law Stationery Society Limited in Liverpool, where he was employed as a painter of illuminated manuscripts. He studied art at the Liverpool College of Art from 1955 to 1957 before moving to  Adelaide, Australia in 1960, where he studied printmaking at the South Australian School of Art under Udo Sellbach.

Work
During 1964–65, Leach-Jones moved back to London, where he produced screenprints influenced by the British pop art of fellow artists Patrick Caulfield and Eduardo Paolozzi. He returned to Australia and settled in Melbourne in 1966.

During the sixties, Leach-Jones was recognized as part of what was then called "the New Abstraction" in Australian art. His work developed into a style still known as Hard-edge painting. Alun Leach-Jones was included in the now notorious 1968 The Field exhibition held at the National Gallery of Victoria.

In 1971 Leach-Jones received a Master Diploma from the National Gallery of Victoria Art School in Melbourne.

In 1978, he painted a permanent mural called Sydney Summer for Macquarie University in Sydney.

Exhibitions
 1968  The Field, National Gallery of Victoria, Melbourne
 1964–92 Australian Galleries, Melbourne
 1967–1972 Watters Gallery, Sydney
 1970–84 Ray Hughes Gallery, Brisbane
 1976–82 Rudy Komon Gallery, Sydney
 1976–86 Solander Gallery, Canberra
 1987–91 Luise Ross Gallery, New York, USA
 2005–12 Rex Irwin Art Dealer, Sydney

Collections
 Solomon R. Guggenheim Museum, New York
 Museum of Modern Art, New York
 National Gallery of Australia, Canberra
 Art Gallery of New South Wales
 Art Gallery of South Australia
 National Gallery of Victoria
 Queensland Art Gallery, Brisbane
 Art Gallery of Western Australia, Perth
 National Museum of Wales, Cardiff
 The British Museum, London
 Victoria and Albert Museum, London
 Ashmolean Museum, Oxford
 Glynn Vivan Art Gallery, Swansea
 Museum of Modern Art, Machynlleth, Wales
 Walker Art Gallery, Liverpool
 National Gallery of Malaysia, Kuala Lumpur
 National Performing Arts Centre, Bombay
 Parliament House Collection, Canberra
 Auckland City Art Gallery, New Zealand
 Perth Cultural Centre, Western Australia
 Bendigo Art Gallery, Victoria
 Art Bank, Sydney
 Western Sydney University Art collection

Awards
 1985 Fremantle Print Award
 1999 Honorary Life Fellow of the Royal Society of Painter-Printmakers, London

References

External links
 Images of Leach-Jones' prints held by the National Gallery of Australia  at http://artsearch.nga.gov.au/Search.cfm?CREIRN=11929&ORDER_SELECT=1&VIEW_SELECT=4
 Images of Leach-Jones' prints held by the Art Gallery of New South Wales at http://www.artgallery.nsw.gov.au/collection/works/?artist_id=leach-jones-alun
 Transcript of Interview by James Gleeson with Alun Leach-Jones 23 May 1979,  National Gallery of Australia  at http://nga.gov.au/Research/Gleeson/artists/Jones.cfm

1937 births
2017 deaths
Australian printmakers
20th-century Australian sculptors
People from Maghull
People from Melbourne
Alumni of Liverpool College of Art